The Great Rites Controversy took place in the decade following 1524 in Ming China. It pitted the young and newly enthroned Jiajing Emperor against the Grand Secretary Yang Tinghe and the majority of the Confucian officials in his government.

The Jiajing Emperor had succeeded his first cousin, the Zhengde Emperor after the latter died childless. His uncle, the Hongzhi Emperor, had not left any other surviving children either. In order to perform the proper rituals owed him according to tradition, it was necessary that the Jiajing Emperor be posthumously adopted by his late uncle who has been dead for nearly two decades. The Jiajing Emperor was reluctant to do this partly because he feared the influence of the Hongzhi Emperor's surviving wife, Empress Dowager Zhang. In this he had the support of his biological mother, who was angered by the prospect that her son could be removed from her by adoption.

The conflict between the emperor backed by his mother and officialdom backed by the empress dowager was finally broken by memorials to the throne (namely, by newly qualified scholar-bureaucrats Zhang Cong and Gui E) arguing that rituals performed contrary to the emperor's own heart would be against human nature. Encouraged by this, gradually Emperor Jiajing fostered the idea of "ascending the clan but not the lineage" and grew more presumptuous.

The core counter-argument to Emperor Jiajing's claim, supported by a large majority of court officials, had to do with the imperial treatment of the Zhengde Emperor and his widow Empress Xia. The couple together had passed the throne to their cousin instead of an adopted child of their own, in favor of their mother-in-law. As a matter of fact, Emperor Jiajing's grandfather Emperor Chenghua had other great-grandsons and this was brought up in the discussion of royal succession with the empress dowager, prior to summoning Emperor Jiajing to Beijing in her name.

Emperor Jiajing decided to allow his own father Zhu Youyuan, the late Prince Xian of Xing, to be posthumously elevated to the status of emperor and particularly be granted seniority over Zhengde Emperor. Grand Secretary Yang Tinghe was forced into retirement; his son Yang Shen who led the counter-argument was sent to exile and nearly murdered on the way. By the end of Emperor Jiajing's one-sided settlement, enemies and dissenters at court were beaten (sometimes to death), imprisoned, or banished. According to the histories this marked the beginning of the young emperor's authoritarian rule.

References

1524 in China
Controversies in China
Ming dynasty politics